Son Eun-ju (born 2 June 1990) is a South Korean road and track cyclist. She won the bronze medal in the team pursuit and in the individual pursuit at the 2016 Asian Cycling Championships.

Major results
Source: 

2009
 6th Road race, East Asian Games
2010
 1st  Time trial, Asian Road Championships
2011
 2nd  Time trial, Asian Road Championships
2015
 2nd Road race, National Road Championships
2016
 Asian Track Championships
3rd  Individual pursuit
3rd  Team pursuit (with Lee Ju-hee, Kang Hyeong-Yeong and Kim You-ri)
2017
 Asian Track Championships
2nd  Madison (with Kang Hyeong-Yeong)
3rd  Team pursuit (with Lee Ju-mi, Kang Hyeong-Yeong and Kim You-ri)

References

External links
 
 

1990 births
Living people
South Korean track cyclists
South Korean female cyclists
Place of birth missing (living people)
20th-century South Korean women
21st-century South Korean women